Patrick Besson (born 1 June 1956) is a French writer and journalist.

Life
Besson was born of a half Russian father and a Croatian mother. He published his first novel, Early Mornings of Love, in 1974, aged 17.

A Communist sympathizer, Besson is a literary chronicler with the newspaper L'Humanité. He also wrote for the newspaper L'Idiot international, whose editor is Jean-Edern Hallier.

Besson supported Serbia during the Yugoslav Wars, which created tension with other intellectuals like Michel Polac, Romain Goupil and Didier Daeninckx. Attacks by Daeninckx led Besson to criticize him in a novel, called Didier Denounces (editions Gerard de Villiers).

Besson wrote a poem, Sonnet Pour Florence Rey, in dedication to the girl who went on a killing spree in Paris in 1994.

In 1987, "L'Humanite" sent Besson to Brazzaville to attend a congress of writers against the South African apartheid.

Awards
Besson received a Grand prix du roman de l'Académie française in 1985 for Dara and the Prix Renaudot in 1995 for Braban.

He was awarded Order of the Serbian Flag.

Works
Les Petits Maux d'amour, éditeur : Seuil 1974
L'école des absents, éditeur : Du Seuil 1976
La Maison du jeune homme seul, éditeur : Hachette 1979
La boum, avec Danièle Thompson, Éditions Jai Lu 1983
Dara, Éditions du Seuil 1985
La Chute de Saigon : Théâtre 1986, éditeur : Messidor
Lettres d'Europe, avec (France) Symposium international sur l'identité culturell 1988
La statue du commandeur, éditeur : Albin Michel 1988
Ah! Berlin et Autres Récits, éditeur : Gallimard 1989
Un peu d'humanité, éditeur Messedor 1989
Divers gauche, éditeur Messedor 1990
La Paresseuse, éditeur Albin Michel 1990
Le congrès de Tours n'aura pas, édition : Messidor 1990
Les années Isabelle, éditeur : du Rocher ; réédition en 2010, éditeur : Millee
Rot coco, Éditeur : R. Deforges 1991
Les ai-je bien descendus? éditeur : Messidor 1991
Je sais des histoires, éditeur : du Rocher 1991
Julius et Isaac, éditeur : Albin Michel 1992
Le deuxième couteau, éditeur : Christophe Barrault 1993
La femme riche, éditeur : Albin Michel 1993
Le viol de Mike Tyson, Editeur : Scandéditions 1993()
L'argent du parti, éditeur : Le Temps des cerises 1993
Pas trop près de l'écran, with Éric Neuhoff, éditions du Rocher 1993
Souvenir d'une galaxie dite nationale-bolchevique éditions du Rocher 1994
Les Braban, éditions Albin Michel 1995
Sonnet pour Florence Rey et autres textes, éditeur : L'Âge d'Homme 1996
Folks, ou, [o kósmos], éditeur : du Rocher 1996
Haldred: Récit, éditeur : Calmann-Lévy 1996
Amicalement rouge, éditeur : Messidor 1996
Didier dénonce, éditeur : G. de Villiers 1997
Dedans, dehors: Les nouvelles frontières de l'organisation, éditeur : Vuibert 1998
Lettre à un ami perdu, éditeur : Jai lu 1998
Belgrade 99, suivi de Contre les calomniateurs de la Serbie, éditeur : L'Âge d'Homme 1999
La Titanic, éditeur: Rocher Eds Du 1999
Accessible à certaine mélancolie, éditeur : Albin Michel 2000
J'aggrave mon cas, éditeur : Rocher 2001
Lui, éditeur : Point 2001
Le deuxième couteau, éditeur : Lgf 2001
L'Orgie échevelée, éditeur : Fayard 2001
28, boulevard Aristide Briand, éditeur : Christian de Bartillat 2001
Un état d'esprit éditeur : Fayard 2002
Vous n'auriez pas vu ma chaîne en or ?, éditeur : La Table ronde 2002
28, boulevard Aristide-Briand, suivi de "Vacances en Botnie", éditeur : J'ai lu 2003
Paris vu dans l'eau, éditeur : Presses De La Renaissance 2003
Les Voyageurs du Trocadéro, éditeur : Rocher Eds 2003
Le Sexe fiable, éditeur : Mille et une nuits 2004
Encore que, éditeur : Mille et une nuits 2004
Solderie, éditeur : Fayard 2004
La Cause du people, éditeur : Fayard 2004
Le dîner de filles, éditeur : Le Serpent à Plumes 2005
Les Frères de la Consolation, éditeur : Grasset & Fasquelle 2005
Ma rentrée littéraire, éditeur : Cavatinea 2005
Saint-Sépulcre !, éditions Points 2005
Le corps d'Agnès Le Roux, éditeur : fayard 2006
Marilyn Monroe n'est pas morte, éditeur : Mille et une nuits 2006
Défiscalisées, éditeur : Mille et une nuits 2006
Zodiaque amoureux, éditeur : Mille et une nuits 2006
Nostalgie de la princesse, éditeur : Fayard 2006
Belle-sœur, éditeur : Fayard 2007
La Science du baiser, éditeur : Points 2007
Accessible à certaine mélancolie, éditeur : Points 2007
Et la nuit seule entendit leurs paroles , éditeur : Mille et une nuits 2008
La Statue du commandeur , éditeur : Points Publication 2008
1974, éditeur : Fayard 2009
Mais le fleuve tuera l'homme blanc, éditeur : Fayard 2009
La Haine de la Hollande, éditeur : Infini Cercle Bleu  2009

References

1956 births
French journalists
Living people
20th-century French novelists
20th-century French male writers
21st-century French novelists
Prix Renaudot winners
Grand Prix du roman de l'Académie française winners
French male novelists
French people of Russian descent
French people of Croatian descent
21st-century French male writers
French male non-fiction writers